Margareta Biörnstad (23May 1928 – 1November 2019), was a Swedish archaeologist. She was Sweden's first female National Antiquarian from 1987 to 1993.

Personal life 
Biörnstad, born Sköld in Stockholm, was the daughter of former Swedish Minister for Defence Per Edvin Sköld and Edit Persson. She was the sister to former Chief of the Army Nils Sköld and former Marshal of the Realm Per Sköld. In 1952, she married Arne Biörnstad (1924–2012). , she lived in Stockholm.

Career 
She got her fil.lic. degree in archaeology in 1955, and in 1992, she received an honorary doctorate from the Chalmers University of Technology. In 1951, she started working at the Swedish National Heritage Board and the Swedish History Museum, where she was Head Antiquarian from 1972 to 1987, and in 1987 she became Sweden's first female National Antiquarian, a position she held until 1993.

From 1967 to 1975, Biörnstad was a member of the Museum and Exhibition Expert Committee (MUS 65). The project caused much debate and resulted in giving increased responsibility to the County Administrative Boards for the counties' local cultural heritage. She was also a member of the Humanities and Social Science Research Council ( (HSFR)) as well as a board member of the Swedish Centre for Architecture and Design. During her time as National Antiquarian, infrastructure in Stockholm as well as other parts of Sweden went through major changes. Biörnstad became instrumental in recording, preserving and preventing destruction of archaeological sites and cultural heritage as water power was expanded and new railways were constructed.

Biörnstad was awarded the Gösta Berg Medal in 2006 and the Illis quorum in 2016 and is an honorary member of the Stockholms nation in Uppsala.

Margareta Biörnstad Fund 
The Margareta Biörnstad Fund was created in 1993 by Biörnstad's friends and colleagues to honor her as she retired. The purpose of the fund is to further international cooperation within the field of cultural heritage by financing field trips, further studies and international activities.

Works 
Biörnstad has written several book and articles about archaeological sites and finds, as well as cultural heritage.

Books, a selection

References

Bibliography

Further reading

External links 
 Interview with Margareta Biörnstad about the development of archaeology in Sweden (1996)

1928 births
Swedish archaeologists
20th-century Swedish women writers
Writers from Stockholm
2019 deaths
Swedish women archaeologists
Recipients of the Illis quorum